State Road 92 (NM 92) is a state highway in the US state of New Mexico. NM 92's western terminus is a continuation as Virden Highway at the Arizona–New Mexico state line, and the eastern terminus is at U.S. Route 70 (US 70) south of Virden.

Major intersections

See also

References

092
Transportation in Hidalgo County, New Mexico